Gornja Košana (in older sources Gorenja Košana) is a village west of Pivka in the Inner Carniola region of Slovenia.

The local church in the settlement is dedicated to the Visitation of the Blessed Virgin Mary and belongs to the Parish of Košana.

References

External links

Gornja Košana on Geopedia

Populated places in the Municipality of Pivka